Tom Berhus (born 12 January 1975) is a retired Norwegian football midfielder.

References

1975 births
Living people
Sportspeople from Kristiansand
Norwegian footballers
IK Start players
Norwegian First Division players
Eliteserien players
Association football midfielders